Zaichenko is a village in Mariupol Raion (district) in Donetsk Oblast of eastern Ukraine, at 89.7 km SSE from the centre of Donetsk city, at 23.6 km SE from Volnovakha, at about 15 km east from Mariupol.

The settlement was taken under control of pro-Russian forces backed by Russian troops in August 2014, during the War in Donbass.

On 24 January 2015 Mariupol was targeted by the multiple rocket launchers "Uragan" firing from the village.

Demographics
In 2001 the settlement had 311 inhabitants. Native language as of the Ukrainian Census of 2001:
Ukrainian — 16.08%
Russian — 82.96%

References

Villages in Mariupol Raion